A résumé is a summary of a person's employment and education, used when seeking work.

Résumé may also refer to:
 Résumé (album), a 2012 album by Eberhard Weber
 Resumé (magazine), a Swedish magazine
 Résumé, a 1999 album by John Taylor